Duke of York Island is the largest island of Duke of York Islands, Papua New Guinea, at . The island is named after Prince Edward, the brother of King George III of Great Britain.

Islands of Papua New Guinea